Emanuel Celler (May 6, 1888 – January 15, 1981) was an American politician from New York who served in the United States House of Representatives for almost 50 years, from March 1923 to January 1973. He served as the dean of the United States House of Representatives from 1965 to 1973. Celler was particularly involved in issues relating to the judiciary and immigration.

A member of the Democratic Party, Celler strongly supported help for Jewish refugees fleeing Europe during World War II.  As Chairman of the House Judiciary Committee for all but two years between 1949 and 1973, he ushered the major civil rights legislation of the era through the House. His district was based in Brooklyn and Queens.

In the early 1970s, Celler took a position in opposition to the women's Equal Rights Amendment.  He was defeated in the 1972 primary by Elizabeth Holtzman, becoming the most senior Representative ever to lose a primary. He ranks as the longest-serving New York member of Congress ever.

Early life
Celler was born in Brooklyn, the son of Josephine (née Müller) and Henry H. Celler. All his grandparents emigrated from Germany. His paternal grandparents and maternal grandmother were Jewish; his maternal grandfather was Catholic. A graduate of Boys High School in Brooklyn, Columbia College, Columbia University, and Columbia Law School, Celler was admitted to the New York bar in 1912.

Celler worked as a practicing lawyer before entering politics, and in 1922 became the first Democrat ever elected to serve his district. He ranks as the fifth longest-serving congressman in history (only John Dingell, Jamie Whitten, John Conyers, and Carl Vinson served longer) and as the longest-serving member of either house of Congress in New York's history.

Service in the House of Representatives
During his first twenty-two years in Congress, 1923–1945, Celler's Brooklyn and Queens-based district was numbered as New York's 10th congressional district. Redistricting in 1944 put him into the 15th district from 1945 to 1953; from 1953 to 1963 his district was the 11th; and for his final decade in the United States Congress, 1963–1973, it was back to its 1922 designation as the 10th. For his final campaign in 1972, the district had been renumbered as the 16th.

Celler made his first important speech on the House floor during consideration of the Johnson–Reed Immigration Act of 1924. Three years earlier, Congress had imposed a quota that limited immigration for persons of any nationality to 3 percent of that nationality present in the United States in 1910, with an annual admission limit of 356,000 immigrants. This national origin system was structured to preserve the ethnic and religious identity of the United States by reducing immigration from Eastern and Southern Europe, thereby excluding many Jews, Catholics, among others. Celler was vehemently opposed to the Johnson-Reed Act, which passed the isolationist Congress and was signed into law. Celler had found his cause and for the next four decades he vigorously spoke out in favor of eliminating the national origin quotas as a basis for immigration restriction.

In July 1939, a strongly worded letter from Celler to U.S. Secretary of State Cordell Hull helped set in motion an extremely prolonged process of 45 years that finally led in 1984, three years after Celler's death, to full, formal diplomatic relations between the United States and the Holy See.

In the 1940s, Celler opposed both the isolationists and the Franklin D. Roosevelt administration by forcefully advocating that the United States relax immigration laws on an emergency basis to rescue those fleeing the Holocaust. In 1943, he called President Roosevelt's immigration policy "cold and cruel" and blasted the "glacier-like attitude" of the State Department.

In 1950, he was the lead House sponsor of legislation to strengthen the Clayton Antitrust Act of 1914; the bill, written with Tennessee Senator Estes Kefauver, became the Celler-Kefauver Act, which closed key regulatory loopholes, empowering the government to prevent vertical mergers and conglomerate mergers which could limit competition.

In 1951, Celler conducted hearings in the United States House Judiciary Committee to examine the anti-trust exemption granted to Major League Baseball (MLB). Celler entered the hearings believing that MLB needed laws to support the reserve clause. Star players, such as Lou Boudreau and Pee Wee Reese, indicated their support of the reserve clause. Minor league veteran Ross Horning testified about his experiences in baseball, which he said were more common for rank-and-file players. Cy Block, who appeared briefly in the major leagues, testified about his experiences and how the reserve clause prevented him from getting an extended trial in the major leagues. Celler's final report suggested that the Congress should take no action, allowing for the matter to be settled in the federal judiciary of the United States. In 1953, the Supreme Court of the United States upheld MLB's anti-trust exemption and the reserve clause in Toolson v. New York Yankees, Inc..

In the early 1950s, the Republican Senator Joseph McCarthy attacked Celler's patriotism. At the 1952 Democratic National Convention, Celler gave a speech in which he responded to Sen. McCarthy, saying:
"Deliberately and calculatedly, McCarthyism has set before itself the task of undermining the faith of the people in their Government. It has undertaken to sow suspicion everywhere, to set friend against friend and brother against brother. It deals in coercion and in intimidation, tying the hands of citizens and officials with the fear of the smear attack."

As Chairman of the House Judiciary Committee from 1949 to 1973 (except for a break from 1953–55 when the Republicans controlled the House), Celler was involved in drafting and passing the Civil Rights Act of 1964, the Civil Rights Act of 1968 and the Voting Rights Act of 1965.  He worked closely with Rep. William Moore McCulloch of Ohio, the Ranking Member, to craft sufficient bipartisan support in the House to overwhelm Southern Democrat opposition in the Senate. In January 1965, Celler proposed in the House of Representatives the Twenty-fifth Amendment, which clarifies an ambiguous provision of the Constitution regarding succession to the presidency. Also in 1965, he proposed and steered to passage the Hart-Celler Act, which eliminated national origins as a consideration for immigration. This was the culminating moment in Celler's 41-year fight to overcome restriction on immigration to the United States based on national origin. The U.S. Gun Control Act of 1968 directly evolved from Celler's Bill H.R. 17735.

In June 1972, Celler (then the House of Representatives' most senior member) unexpectedly lost the Democratic primary to a somewhat more liberal Democrat, attorney Elizabeth Holtzman, who eked out a 635-vote victory over Celler, based chiefly on Celler's opposition to feminism and the Equal Rights Amendment. At the time, Celler was the most senior congressman ever to have been ousted in a primary. Even though Celler remained on the ballot as the candidate of the Liberal Party, he decided not to campaign and endorsed Holtzman in September. This allowed Holtzman to win the general election that November with 66% of the vote, versus 23% for her Republican opponent. Celler received 7%.

Final years

In his final years, Celler remained busy, speaking about immigration and myriad other topics that occupied his half-century of public service. During the Watergate scandal of 1973–74, he was a frequent guest on television and radio programs, discussing the hearings and the position of Chairman of the Judiciary Committee, which he held for a record number of years. If not for his electoral loss a few months before, Celler, not Peter Rodino of New Jersey, would have been conducting the hearings. Celler was on good terms with Richard Nixon and in the early part of the hearings indicated that he would have taken a less adversarial position than Rodino.

In 1978, shortly after his 90th birthday, he granted an interview in which he reflected on his life and the presidents he had known, from Warren G. Harding to Gerald Ford who, like Presidents Kennedy, Johnson, and Nixon, had been Celler's House of Representatives colleague. The interview, however, is now lost as is the citation. 

Emanuel Celler died in his native Brooklyn at the age of 92.

See also
 List of Jewish members of the United States Congress

References

Publications
You Never Leave Brooklyn (autobiography), New York, John Day Co., 1953
 Emanuel Celler: Immigration and Civil Rights Champion (biography), Dawkins, Wayne, Jackson, UPM, 2020

External links

Bio of Celler at Jewish Virtual Library
Bio of Celler with excerpts from his speeches and his autobiography, You Never Leave Brooklyn (1953)
Passover 1943: A Congressman Who Spoke Out for Rescue by Dr. Rafael Medoff
Emanuel Celler biography

1888 births
1981 deaths
20th-century American lawyers
20th-century American politicians
Activists for African-American civil rights
American people of German-Jewish descent
Boys High School (Brooklyn) alumni
Columbia College (New York) alumni
Columbia Law School alumni
Deans of the United States House of Representatives
Democratic Party members of the United States House of Representatives from New York (state)
Jewish members of the United States House of Representatives
New York (state) lawyers
Politicians from Brooklyn